Sauer's Garden is a neighborhood in the West End of Richmond, Virginia. The neighborhood began development in the 1920s, and now contains about 300 homes.

History 
The neighborhood was developed and named for Conrad Frederick Sauer, founder of the C. F. Sauer Company.

Development of the neighborhood began in the 1920s, and was originally focused around a large garden property, which included a fountain, lake and an "artificial mountain".  The garden later went into disrepair and was torn down in the 1980s.

Subdivisions 

Sauer's Garden is divided into the follow subdivisions: 

 Leonard Heights
 Monument Avenue Gardens
 Patterson Annex

References 

Neighborhoods in Richmond, Virginia